Aryon Dall'Igna Rodrigues (4 July 1925, in Curitiba – 24 April 2014, in Brasília) was a Brazilian linguist, considered one of the most renowned researchers of the indigenous languages of Brazil.

Education and early career
In 1959, Rodrigues was the first Brazilian to obtain a PhD in linguistics at the University of Hamburg. Aryon Rodrigues was invited by Darcy Ribeiro to organize the first post-graduate program in Linguistics in Brazil, in the recently founded Universidade de Brasília (UnB). Aryon left UnB following the coup in 1964, in solidarity with his colleagues dismissed and persecuted by the military, moving to UFRJ and later to UNICAMP.

Research and publications
Throughout his career, which lasted nearly seventy years, he dedicated himself to the analysis of various languages such as Xetá and Tupinambá, of the Tupi-Guarani family, and Kipeá of the Kariri family (Macro-Jê). In addition to descriptive and theoretical works in linguistics, Rodrigues contributed to the study of historical and comparative linguistics of the indígenous languages of the continent, particularly of the Tupi family. He proposed the Je–Tupi–Carib hypothesis, which links Tupí, Macro-Jê and Karíb together as part of the same macrofamily.

Aryon Rodrigues published more than 150 scientific works, among them articles, book chapters and books. He created and directed the Laboratório de Línguas Indígenas (LALI) at UnB, and was one of the creators and editors of the Revista Brasileira de Linguística Antropológica (RBLA). In January 2013, he participated in the creation of the Instituto Aryon Dall'Igna Rodrigues (IADR), which will serve as the repository of his papers. Rodrigues died on 24 April 2014.

References

1925 births
2014 deaths
Linguists from Brazil
Linguists of Tupian languages
Linguists of indigenous languages of South America
Paleolinguists
University of Hamburg alumni
Academic staff of the University of Brasília
20th-century linguists
21st-century linguists